Events in the year 1906 in India.

Incumbents
 Emperor of India – Edward VII
 Viceroy of India – Gilbert Elliot-Murray-Kynynmound, 4th Earl of Minto

Events
 National income - 10,684 million
 George, Prince of Wales, and Princess Mary tour India, 1905-06
1 January – British India officially adopts Indian Standard Time.
 11 September – Mahatma Gandhi coins the term Satyagraha to characterize the Non-violence movement in South Africa.
 30 December – The All-India Muslim League, a political organization that represented the interests of Indian Muslims, is formed.
 First fertilizer factory in India (Ranipet, Tamil Nadu)

Law
Mamlatdars Courts Act
Coinage Act

Births
25 August  Kirupanandha Variyar, spiritual teacher and guru (died 1993).
3 November – Prithviraj Kapoor, actor, director, thespian (died 1972).
23 December – Edasseri Govindan Nair, poet, playwright and essayist (died 1974).

Deaths
 20 August - Anandamohan Bose, politician, academic and social reformer (born 1847)
 2 October - Raja Ravi Varma , Indian painter. 
 21 December - Acharya Rajendrasuri, reformer in Shvetambar sect of Jainism (born 1827).

References

 
India
Years of the 20th century in India